"Epigrams on Programming" is an article by Alan Perlis published in 1982, for ACM's SIGPLAN journal. The epigrams are a series of short, programming-language-neutral, humorous statements about computers and programming, which are widely quoted.

It first appeared in SIGPLAN Notices 17(9), September 1982.

In epigram #54, Perlis coined the term "Turing tarpit", which he defined as a programming language where "everything is possible but nothing of interest is easy."

References

External links
 List of quotes (Yale)
 Full article text -- (including so-called "meta epigrams", numbers 122-130)

Magazine articles
Association for Computing Machinery